Jim Hardie is an Emeritus Professor of Insect Physiology at Imperial College London. He is known for work on the biology of aphids and their natural enemies.

Hardie is a Fellow and past President of the Royal Entomological Society (2006-2008), as well as a Fellow of the Royal Microscopical Society.

References

Fellows of the Royal Microscopical Society
Fellows of the Royal Entomological Society
Presidents of the Royal Entomological Society
British entomologists
Living people
Year of birth missing (living people)